Deer Park is a village in Lake and Cook Counties, Illinois. Per the 2020 census, the population was 3,681. The village is one of the few left in the Chicago area that enjoy a green belt which is bordered by two large natural areas providing outdoor recreation and open space.   The village is home to popular shopping and dining destinations: Deer Park Town Center and the Town Center Promenade.  The town is also home to the Vehe Farm, an Illinois Centennial Farm.

Upscale townhomes are available near the Deer Park Center. The Metra/Chicago & Northwestern train line provides commuter service to Chicago with stations in nearby Barrington and Palatine.

Geography

Demographics
As of the 2020 census there were 3,681 people, 1,377 households, and 1,124 families residing in the village. The racial makeup of the village was 85.41% White, 0.65% African American, 0.27% Native American, 7.85% Asian, 0.00% Pacific Islander, 1.01% from other races, and 4.81% from two or more races. Hispanic or Latino of any race were 3.31% of the population.

There were 1,377 households, out of which 77.49% had children under the age of 18 living with them, 76.25% were married couples living together, 3.92% had a female householder with no husband present, and 18.37% were non-families. 17.28% of all households were made up of individuals, and 9.88% had someone living alone who was 65 years of age or older. The average household size was 3.29 and the average family size was 2.91.

The village's age distribution consisted of 26.9% under the age of 18, 6.9% from 18 to 24, 19.7% from 25 to 44, 31% from 45 to 64, and 15.4% who were 65 years of age or older. The median age was 43.5 years. For every 100 females, there were 90.1 males. For every 100 females age 18 and over, there were 94.0 males.

The median income for a household in the village was $161,422, and the median income for a family was $192,708. Males had a median income of $117,120 versus $76,635 for females. The per capita income for the village was $73,578. About 0.3% of families and 1.3% of the population were below the poverty line, including 0.4% of those under age 18 and 5.0% of those age 65 or over.

Note: the US Census treats Hispanic/Latino as an ethnic category. This table excludes Latinos from the racial categories and assigns them to a separate category. Hispanics/Latinos can be of any race.

Education
There are no public schools in Deer Park, but it is served by either Isaac Fox Elementary School, Lake Zurich Middle School South and Lake Zurich High School or Arnett Lines Elementary School, Barrington Middle School Prairie Campus and Barrington High School.

References

External links
Village of Deer Park

Villages in Illinois
Chicago metropolitan area
Villages in Lake County, Illinois
Villages in Cook County, Illinois
Populated places established in 1957
1957 establishments in Illinois